The Vita Sadalbergae (English Life of Sadalberga) is an anonymous Latin biography of Saint Sadalberga, founder of the Abbey of St John, Laon. Its author claims to be writing at the behest of Sadalberga's daughter and successor as abbess, Anstrude, but the date and reliability of the Vita are disputed by scholars.

The Vita's 19th-century editor, Bruno Krusch, argued that it was a forgery of the 9th century and of no historical value. He claimed that it invented numerous details, such as Sadalberga's forced marriage and children, and believed that only reliable source for the saint's life was her contemporary, Jonas of Bobbio, author of the Vita sancti Columbani. More recently, Hans Hummer has argued that it was written in the late 7th or early 8th century, within a lifetime of the events it describes. Jamie Kreiner places it around 680, a decade or so after Sadalberga's death.

The author of the Vita had access to the writings of Jonas on Sadalberga. He embellished this material without falsifying the basic outline. His vivid narrative gives the impression of an eyewitness. Since there is no evidence of a cult of Sadalberga at Laon, it is not clear who would have sponsored or profited from the production of a literary forgery in the 9th century.

The Vita is the only source for the civil war between Dagobert II (676–79) and Theuderic III (675–91). Since the family and its monastic foundations suffered during the war, the Vita Sadalbergae along with the Vita Anstrudis may have been composed in the immediate aftermath as part of an effort to restore the reputation of both.

References

Editions
Bruno Krusch, ed. "Vita Sadalbergae abbatissae Laudunensis", in Monumenta Germaniae Historicae, Scriptores rerum Merovingicarum, 5 (Hanover: Hahn, 1910), pp. 40–66.
Translated in Jo Ann McNamara, John E. Halborg, E. Gordon Whatley, eds. Sainted women of the Dark Ages (Duke University Press, 1992), pp. 176–194.

Further reading
Hummer, Hans. (2003) "Die merowingische Herkunft der Vita Sadalbergae". Deutsches Archiv für Erforschung des Mittelalters 59: 459–93.

7th-century Latin books
7th-century Christian texts
Christian hagiography
Christianity in Francia
Merovingian period